The right bank of the estuary of the river Nervión in Biscay, Spain is part of the Metropolitan Area of Bilbao and is formed by the towns of Getxo, Leioa and Erandio. It includes affluent neighbourhoods like Neguri and Las Arenas, traditionally the residential areas of the industrial bourgeoisie. The municipality of Getxo is routinely listed amongst the cities with the highest real estate prices and personal income levels in Spain.

The "Puente Colgante" joins it with the Left Bank. The distinction between the two banks has dimmed as the industrial crisis and the lack of building space caused the population of both to merge, and many chalets gave way to apartment blocks. However, both banks are still distinguishable by economic, demographic and political indicators.

Geography of Bilbao
Geography of Biscay
Getxo
Estuary of Bilbao